Michael Roden (born February 11, 1961) is Professor and Chairman of Internal Medicine, Endocrinology and Metabolic Disorders at Heinrich Heine University Düsseldorf, Director of the Division of Endocrinology and Diabetology at the University Hospital of Düsseldorf and Spokesman for the Executive Board and Scientific Director of the German Diabetes Center, the Leibniz Center for Diabetes Research at the Heinrich Heine University Düsseldorf (Legal body: Deutsche Diabetes-Forschungsgesellschaft eV).

Career and appointments 
After finishing high school at Akademisches Gymnasium Vienna, Austria, and study of medicine in 1986 at the University of Vienna, he started his career as an assistant at the Pharmacological Institute.  In 1988, he began working at the 1st Medical University Clinic of the University of Vienna, where he acquired the “venia legendi” in Internal Medicine in 1994. He then worked as Max-Kade Fellow in the Section of Endocrinology at Yale University in 1994/1995. After returning to the Division for Endocrinology and Metabolism at the University Clinic of Internal Medicine III at the General Hospital Vienna as a senior physician, he was appointed as Associate Professor in 1997. From 2003 to 2009, he served as chairman and director of the 1st Medical Department including the Division of Nephrology at Hanusch Hospital, Teaching Hospital of the Medical University of Vienna. In 2005, he founded the Karl Landsteiner Institute for Endocrinology and Metabolic Diseases. After accepting the call as chairman and professor in Düsseldorf, he became a board member of the German Center for Diabetes Research in 2009. In 2016, he was appointed by the Federal President of Germany as a member of the Science Council of the Federal Government and the Governments of the federal states of Germany. Since 2017, he has been contributing his knowledge and experience there as Chairman of its Medical Committee. As President, he led the 54th annual meeting of the German Diabetes Association in 2019 with the slogan "Diabetes - Not only a question of type".

Research contributions 
Michael Roden’s research focusses on energy metabolism in humans under physiological conditions and with metabolic disorders such as metabolic syndrome, diabetes mellitus and non-alcoholic fatty liver disease.   He has made major contributions to our understanding of the cellular mechanisms of fatty acid- and amino acid-induced insulin resistance in humans.  Additionally, he examined the function of mitochondria in muscle and liver tissue. With his research group, he is contributing to the development of novel non-invasive methods for real-time analysis of tissue-specific metabolism.  His studies demonstrated that alterations of mitochondrial function can decisively influence the development and progress of diabetes and non-alcoholic fatty liver disease.  His recent research contributes to a novel differentiation of diabetes subtypes with various risks for their sequelae and promotes the way to precision medicine for people with diabetes.

Roden is the author of more than 500 "peer-reviewed" publications, co-author of (inter)national guidelines and the editor of the book "Clinical Diabetes Research: Methods and Techniques".  According to the Scopus database, it has an h-index of 77.

Selected honors/affiliations/awards 
 2001 Ferdinand-Bertram Award of the German Diabetes Society
 2001 Novartis (Sandoz) Award for Chemistry, Biology, Medicine, Austria
 2004 International Novartis Award for Innovative Patient Oriented Research
 2006 ESCI (Mack-Foster) Award for Excellence in Clinical Sciences
 2006 Oskar-Minkowski Award of the European Association for the Study of Diabetes
 2013 Honorary doctorate from the Medical Faculty of the University of Belgrade
 2014 Somogyi Award of the Hungarian Diabetes Society (Magyar Diabetes Társaság)
 2016 Honorary doctorate from the Medical Faculty of the National and Kapodistrian University Athens
 2017 Paul-Langerhans Medal of the German Diabetes Society (DDG)
 2018 G. B. Morgagni Prize and Gold Medal Career Achievement
 2019 Scientific Advisory Board of the Medical University of Vienna, Austria

Selected works

Guidelines 
 Norbert Stefan, Michael Roden: Diabetes and Fatty Liver. In: Experimental and Clinical Endocrinology & Diabetes. 127, Nr. S 01, 2019, ISSN 0947-7349, S. S93–S96. DOI: 10.1055/a-0984-5753
 EASL–EASD–EASO Clinical Practice Guidelines for the management of non-alcoholic fatty liver disease. In: Journal of Hepatology. 64, Nr. 6, 2016, ISSN 0168-8278, S. 1388–1402. DOI:10.1016/j.jhep.2015.11.004.

Books 
 Michael Roden: Clinical Diabetes Research: Methods and Techniques. John Wiley & Sons, Chichester, West Sussex, England Hoboken, NJ 2007, .

Publications 

Roden, M, Shulman, GI, 2019. Integrative biology of type 2 diabetes. Nature, Bd. 576, S. 51–60. DOI: 10.1038/s41586-019-1797-8
 Gancheva, S, Ouni, M, Jelenik, T, Koliaki, C, Szendroedi, J, Markgraf, D, de Fillipo, E, Herder, C, Jähnert, M, Strassburger, K, Schlensak, M, Schürmann, A & Roden, M, 2019. Dynamic changes of muscle insulin sensitivity after metabolic surgery. Nat. Commun., Bd. 10, S. 4179. DOI: 10.1038/s41467-019-12081-0
 Zaharia, OP, Strassburger, K, Strom, A, Bönhof, GJ, Karusheva, Y, Antoniou, S, Bódis, K, Markgraf, DF, Burkart, V, Müssig, K, Hwang, JH, Asplund, O, Groop, L, Ahlqvist, E, Seissler, J, Nawroth, P, Kopf, S, Schmid, SM, Stumvoll, M, Pfeiffer, AFH, Kabisch, S, Tselmin, S, Häring, HU, Ziegler, D, Kuss, O, Szendroedi, J, Roden, M, 2019. Risk of diabetes-associated diseases in subgroups of patients with recent-onset diabetes: a 5-year follow-up study. Lancet Diabetes Endocrinol., Bd. 7, Nr. 9, S. 657–736. DOI: 10.1016/S2213-8587(19)30187-1
 Gancheva, S, Jelenik, T, Álvarez-Hernández, E, Roden, M, 2018. Interorgan Metabolic Crosstalk in Human Insulin Resistance. Physiological Reviews. 98, Nr. 3, 2018, ISSN 0031-9333, S. 1371–1415. DOI:10.1152/physrev.00015.2017
 Álvarez-Hernández, E, Kahl, S, Seelig, A, Begovatz, P, Irmler, M, Kupriyanova, Y, Nowotny, B, Nowotny, P, Herder, C, Barosa, C, Carvalho, F, Rozman, J, Neschen, S, Jones, JG, Beckers, J, de Angelis, MH & Roden, M, 2017. Acute dietary fat intake initiates alterations in energy metabolism and insulin resistance. J. Clin. Invest., Bd. 127, Nr. 2, S. 695–708. DOI: 10.1172/JCI89444
 Koliaki, C, Szendroedi, J, Kaul, K, Jelenik, T, Nowotny, P, Jankowiak, F, Herder, C, Carstensen, M, Krausch, M, Knoefel, WT, Schlensak, M & Roden, M, 2015. Adaptation of hepatic mitochondrial function in humans with non-alcoholic fatty liver is lost in steatohepatitis. Cell Metab., Bd. 21, Nr. 5, S. 739–46. DOI: 10.1016/j.cmet.2015.04.004
 Szendroedi, J, Yoshimura, T, Phielix, E, Koliaki, C, Marcucci, M, Zhang, D, Jelenik, T, Müller, J, Herder, C, Nowotny, P, Shulman, GI, Roden, M, 2014. Role of diacylglycerol activation of PKCθ in lipid-induced muscle insulin resistance in humans. Proceedings of the National Academy of Sciences. 111, Nr. 26, ISSN 0027-8424, S. 9597–9602. DOI: 10.1073/pnas.1409229111
 Schmid, AI, Szendroedi, J, Chmelik, M, Krssak, M, Moser, E, Roden, M, 2011. Liver ATP Synthesis Is Lower and Relates to Insulin Sensitivity in Patients With Type 2 Diabetes. Diabetes Care. 34, Nr. 2, ISSN 0149-5992, S. 448–453. DOI:10.2337/dc10-1076
 Krebs, M, Krssak, M, Bernroider, E, Anderwald, C, Brehm, A, Meyerspeer, M, Nowotny, P, Roth, E, Waldhausl, W, Roden, R, 2002 Mechanism of Amino Acid-Induced Skeletal Muscle Insulin Resistance in Humans. In: Diabetes. 51, Nr. 3, ISSN 0012-1797, S. 599–605. DOI:10.2337/diabetes.51.3.599
 Roden, M, Krssak, M, Stingl, H, Gruber, S, Hofer, A, Furnsinn, C, Moser, E, Waldhausl, W, 1999. Rapid impairment of skeletal muscle glucose transport/phosphorylation by free fatty acids in humans. Diabetes. 48, Nr. 2, ISSN 0012-1797, S. 358–364. DOI: 10.2337/diabetes.48.2.358

References 

Austrian diabetologists
Austrian endocrinologists
Living people
Academic staff of Heinrich Heine University Düsseldorf
1961 births
University of Vienna alumni
Academic staff of the University of Vienna
Yale University fellows
Minkowski Prize recipients